The 1994–95 Cupa României was the 57th edition of Romania's most prestigious football cup competition.

The title was won by Petrolul Ploiești against Rapid București.

Format
The competition is an annual knockout tournament.

First round proper matches are played on the ground of the lowest ranked team, then from the second round proper the matches are played on a neutral location.

If a match is drawn after 90 minutes, the game goes into extra time. If the match is still tied, the result is decided by penalty kicks.

In the semi-finals, each tie is played as a two legs.

From the first edition, the teams from Divizia A entered in competition in sixteen finals, rule which remained till today.

First round proper

|colspan=3 style="background-color:#97DEFF;"|26 February 1995

|}

Second round proper

|colspan=3 style="background-color:#97DEFF;"|15 March 1995

|}

Quarter-finals

|colspan=3 style="background-color:#97DEFF;"|12 April 1995

|}

Semi-finals
The matches were played on 10 May and 24 May 1995.

||0–0||0–3
||2–0||1–0 
|}

Final

References

External links
 romaniansoccer.ro
 Official site
 The Romanian Cup on the FRF's official site

Cupa României seasons
1994–95 in Romanian football
Romania